Harold E. Clark (October 25, 1893 – July 9, 1973) was an American football player.  A native of Rochester, New York, he attended Cathedral High School. In the earliest years of the National Football League (NFL), he played professional football as an end and back for the Rochester Jeffersons. He appeared in 27 NFL games between 1920 and 1925. He served in the U.S. Navy during World War I and was employed by Security Trust Co. after his football career ended.

References

1893 births
1973 deaths
Rochester Jeffersons players
People from Rochester, New York
Players of American football from New York (state)